Amt Dänischer Wohld is an Amt ("collective municipality") in the district of Rendsburg-Eckernförde, in Schleswig-Holstein, Germany. It is situated between Eckernförde and Kiel, around the village Gettorf, which is the seat of the Amt, but not part of it. It is named after the Dänischer Wohld peninsula, of which the Amt only encompasses a central part.

The Amt Dänischer Wohld consists of the following municipalities:

Felm 
Lindau 
Neudorf-Bornstein 
Neuwittenbek 
Osdorf 
Schinkel 
Tüttendorf

Ämter in Schleswig-Holstein